Robert Davidson (30 March 1927 – 22 September 2012) was professor of Old Testament at the University of Glasgow (Trinity College) and was Moderator of the General Assembly of the Church of Scotland in 1990.

References
https://www.scotsman.com/news/obituaries/obituary-very-rev-professor-robert-davidson-ma-bd-dd-frse-1606069

Academics of the University of Glasgow
Alumni of the University of St Andrews
Fellows of the Royal Society of Edinburgh
20th-century Ministers of the Church of Scotland
1927 births
2012 deaths
Scottish Calvinist and Reformed theologians
Moderators of the General Assembly of the Church of Scotland